Acleros ploetzi, the Ploetz's dart or Ploetz's dusky skipper, is a butterfly in the family Hesperiidae. It is found in Senegal, the Gambia, Guinea-Bissau, Guinea, Sierra Leone, Liberia, Ivory Coast, Ghana, Nigeria, Cameroon, Gabon, the Republic of the Congo, the Democratic Republic of the Congo, Uganda, western Kenya and along the coast, Tanzania, Malawi, Zambia, Mozambique and eastern Zimbabwe. The habitat consists of forests, including secondary growth.

Adults are on wing from July to August and again from February to May.

The larvae feed on Vigna unguiculata.

References

Butterflies described in 1890
Erionotini
Butterflies of Africa